The Fallujah Barrage is a barrage on the Euphrates near Fallujah in Al Anbar Governorate, Iraq. Construction of the barrage was completed in 1985. Unlike many other dams in the Euphrates, the Fallujah Barrage does not include a hydroelectric power station and its main function is to raise the water level of the river for irrigation. The barrage consists of two separate parts. These gates divert water toward two separate irrigation channels.

The construction of the Fallujah Barrage was first proposed in 1923 as part of a large project to increase the production of cotton in Iraq. Construction of the barrage did however start only much later. The barrage was constructed adjacent to the actual Euphrates channel so that the water did not have to be diverted during construction. The Euphrates flow was only diverted toward the barrage in 1985 when it was completed. It was intended that  would be irrigated as part of this project. After the 2003 invasion in Iraq, repairs have been carried out at the Fallujah Barrage.

During the Islamic State of Iraq and the Levant occupation of Fallujah in April 2014, insurgents took control of the barrage and closed its floodgates for several days which briefly deprived downstream areas of water. The gates were later opened likely due to flooding in upstream areas and excessive reservoir levels. The militants also opened the dam in an attempt to flood oncoming Iraqi forces.

References

Dams in Iraq
Al Anbar Governorate
Dams completed in 1985
Fallujah
Dams on the Euphrates River
1985 establishments in Iraq
Barrages (dam)
Crossings of the Euphrates